Malik Raiah (born 20 September 1992) is an Algerian footballer who plays as a midfielder.

On 13 July 2022, Raiah joined Saudi Arabian club Al-Jabalain. On 30 January 2023, Raiah was released by Al-Jabalain.

References

External links

1992 births
Living people
21st-century Algerian people
Association football midfielders
Algerian footballers
JS Kabylie players
NA Hussein Dey players
CS Sfaxien players
Al-Jabalain FC players
Algerian Ligue Professionnelle 1 players
Algerian Ligue 2 players
Tunisian Ligue Professionnelle 1 players
Saudi First Division League players
Algerian expatriate footballers
Expatriate footballers in Tunisia
Expatriate footballers in Saudi Arabia
Algerian expatriate sportspeople in Tunisia
Algerian expatriate sportspeople in Saudi Arabia